Yirawala (c.1897 – 17 April 1976) was an Aboriginal Australian leader, labourer and painter. He was born in the Northern Territory, which at the time was responsibility of the state of South Australia, and died in Minjilang, otherwise known as Croker Island.

Early life

Yirawala was born into the Kunwinjku people at Marrkolidjban, inland from Maningrida, an Indigenous community in Arnhem Land. Little is known of Yirawala’s early life, however, he spent most of his life on Croker Island and retained strong family and cultural ties. His artistic ability became apparent at an early age.

Art career

Yirawala was commonly known as "Picasso of Arnhem Land". Picasso was an admirer of Yirawala’s work and apparently said "When one observes his dynamic use of positive and negative space one understands why this is so."

In 1964 Yirawala met Sandra Le Brun Holmes, who became his patron. She organised his first solo exhibition in 1971. This travelling exhibition of his bark paintings was shown in Adelaide, Melbourne, Orange and Port Morseby.

Art dealers went against Yirawala's wishes of presenting and selling his paintings in story cycles, and most of the profit for his artwork went directly to the art dealers. His artwork was sold both within Australia and overseas. This caused Yirawala to become disillusioned with the art industry and he never knew the outcome of many of his famous and sacred artworks. Yirawala strongly opposed the commercialisation of his work.

Yirawala often told witty stories and had a great sense of humour which prevented him becoming completely disillusioned with the commercial art industry. He is often fondly remembered as having a handsome and dignified face with piercing eyes, shielded by an old bush hat.

School of Yirawala 

Marrkolidjban outstation in the Liverpool River region played an important role in the development of Aboriginal art. It was here that Yirawala taught and influenced other artists such as Curly Bardkadubba, Peter Marralwanga and John Mawurndjul. Techniques in cross-hatching were learned and expanded on by a new generation of artists.

When Yirawala returned to Croker Island, he introduced cross-hatching to artists there, including Midjau Midjau and Samual Wagbara.

Yirawala's willingness to blend different regional painting styles resulted in major artistic and stylistic changes in Aboriginal bark paintings.

Later life 

Yirawala was married three times and had seven children. Little is known about them aside from two sons, Bobby and Danny, who lived on Croker Island. He settled with his family on Croker Island in the late 1950s, by which time he was an influential and important bark painter.

Yirawala was a ceremonial leader, a law-carrier and a medicine man and healer. Yirawala was perceived as a man of integrity and wisdom. He dedicated himself to the preservation of his people’s culture. Lazarus Lamilami described him as one of a great line of ceremonial leaders who inherited sacred designs to be passed on to future generations.

Yirawala was made a Member of the Order of the British Empire (MBE) in 1971 and received the International Art Cooperation Award. Following the awarding of his MBE, Adelaide sculptor John Dowie was commissioned to create a bronze bust of Yirawala. Yirawala believed that this sculpture held his spirit. Yirawala died on 17 April 1976 and his body was taken back to Morgaleetbah, which was also the resting place of his father. After his death, the possession of the bronze sculpture became controversial. At the time, the sculpture was held by the Adelaide Art Gallery, however, after some dispute, it was given to Yirawala’s family.

The National Gallery of Australia acquired 139 of his paintings in 1976. In 1982, one of his paintings was used on the 27¢ stamp, which commemorated the 15th anniversary of the National Gallery. His works are hosted in many Australian state galleries and international collections. He has been the subject of two films: Return to the Dreaming (1968) and The Picasso of Arnhem Land (1982). Images of Yirawala's bark paintings from the National Museum of Australia's collection can be found online.

Notes

References

1890s births
1976 deaths
20th-century Australian painters
Australian Aboriginal artists
Australian Members of the Order of the British Empire